KQRQ (92.3 FM, branded on-air as Q92.3) is a radio station that airs a classic hits format in Rapid City, South Dakota.

External links
KQRQ/Q92.3 official website

QRQ
Classic hits radio stations in the United States
Radio stations established in 2002
2002 establishments in South Dakota